Richard James Caldwell Young (2 February 1845 – 25 January 1885) was an Irish first-class cricketer.

Young was born at Coolkeiragh House in Derry in February 1845. He played one first-class cricket match for the Marylebone Cricket Club (MCC) against the Surrey Club at Lord's in 1873. He batted in both the MCC's innings', scoring 11 runs in their first-innings, before being dismissed by James Southerton; in their second-innings he was dismissed without scoring by Fred Grace.

References

External links

1845 births
1885 deaths
Sportspeople from Derry (city)
Cricketers from Northern Ireland
Marylebone Cricket Club cricketers
Irish cricketers